The Lake Catherine State Park CCC Cabins are a collection of four rustic cabins constructed by crews of the Civilian Conservation Corps in what is now Lake Catherine State Park in Hot Spring County, Arkansas.  Three of the four cabins were built for use as tourist accommodations and continue to serve in that role, while the fourth, probably built to house administrative functions, is now used in the state park as a "nature cabin", with exhibits on the history and natural environment of the park.  Three of the cabins were separately listed on the National Register of Historic Places in 1992; the fourth was listed in 1995.

Cabin #1
Cabin #1 was the first of the tourist cabins to be built by the CCC, and it has a unique floor plan not found in the other cabins.  It is a single-story frame structure, with rough weatherboard exterior and an original stone and concrete foundation.  A screened porch extends across the cabin's southern facade, looking out over the lake, and a dressed stone chimney rises on the east side.  The interior includes a living room, kitchen, hall, bedroom, and bath.

Cabins #2 and #3
Cabins #2 and #3 are both single-story frame structure, with rough weatherboard exterior and a stone chimney.  They were built about 1935.

Nature Cabin
The Nature Cabin was built about 1935, and is also a single-story Rustic structure.  Its original purpose is not known, but it probably housed administrative functions.  It is now used to house exhibits on the park's cultural history and environment.

See also
Lake Catherine State Park-Bridge No. 2
National Register of Historic Places listings in Hot Spring County, Arkansas

References

Residential buildings on the National Register of Historic Places in Arkansas
Buildings and structures completed in 1941
Buildings and structures in Hot Spring County, Arkansas
National Register of Historic Places in Hot Spring County, Arkansas
1941 establishments in Arkansas
Civilian Conservation Corps in Arkansas
Rustic architecture in Arkansas
CCC Cabins